Fountain Springs is a census-designated place in Butler Township, Schuylkill County, Pennsylvania, United States. The population was 100 at the 2000 census.

Geography
Fountain Springs is located at  (40.771330, -76.324754).

Demographics

At the 2000 census there were 100 people, 47 households, and 29 families living in the CDP. The population density was 3,682.9 people per square mile (1,287.0/km). There were 51 housing units at an average density of 1,878.3/sq mi (656.4/km).  The racial makeup of the CDP was 100.00% White.
Of the 47 households 21.3% had children under the age of 18 living with them, 48.9% were married couples living together, 8.5% had a female householder with no husband present, and 36.2% were non-families. 31.9% of households were one person and 17.0% were one person aged 65 or older. The average household size was 2.13 and the average family size was 2.70.

The age distribution was 16.0% under the age of 18, 4.0% from 18 to 24, 30.0% from 25 to 44, 25.0% from 45 to 64, and 25.0% 65 or older. The median age was 45 years. For every 100 females, there were 96.1 males. For every 100 females age 18 and over, there were 86.7 males.

The median household income was $50,750 and the median family income  was $53,333. Males had a median income of $27,321 versus $21,250 for females. The per capita income for the CDP was $18,890. None of the population and none of the families were below the poverty line.

References

Census-designated places in Schuylkill County, Pennsylvania
Census-designated places in Pennsylvania